Tropaeolum speciosum, the flame flower or flame nasturtium, is a species of flowering plant in the family Tropaeolaceae native to Chile, where it is known locally as coralito, quintralito, or voqui.

Description
It climbs through or over other plants to a sunlit position where it flowers profusely. The leaves are palmately lobed with five to seven obovate leaflets. The scarlet, funnel-shaped flowers are spurred and grow on long stalks from the leaf axils. They have widely separated, clawed petals. After the flowers fade, the red calyces persist, curling back to reveal the three blue berries.

Cultivation
The flame flower is not considered easy to grow. In some places it thrives and in others it fails completely. It does particularly well in New Zealand and Scotland. It has been called the "Scottish flame flower" and the "glory of the Highlands". It will grow in full sun or partial sun but likes a cool moist root run and is suited to acid or neutral soils. It can be propagated from seed or by division. It is in USDA Hardiness Zone 8. It must be considered as such because during dormancy it generally retreats to a small underground tuber, where frost often does not penetrate.

This plant has gained the Royal Horticultural Society's Award of Garden Merit.

References

speciosum
Flora of Chile